Madakkathara  is a village in Thrissur district in the state of Kerala, India.

Demographics 
As of the 2001 Indian census, Madakkathara had a population of 13,472 with 6,691 males and 6,781 females.  This village is famous for its agricultural nurseries . The Kerala Agricultural University is located in the village, together with Madakkathara 400 kV Substation, which is operated by Power Grid Corporation of India and Kerala State Electricity Board.

References 

Villages in Thrissur district